Ryan "The Brickman" McNaught (born 1973), is an Australian Lego designer and Lego Certified Professional. He is one of only twenty one professionals globally and the only one in the Southern Hemisphere. In 2019, he joined Channel Nine's TV series Lego Masters Australia, as the main competition judge alongside host Hamish Blake.

Early life and education
McNaught was born in 1973 and grew up in Shepparton, Victoria. His parents owned a travel agency in Melbourne.

McNaught got his first Lego set from his grandma when he was three years old. In 1978, at the age of five, McNaught won a Master Builders' Certificate in the Victoria finals of the Myer Lego National Building Competition.

As a teenager, he turned his attention to sport. Playing football for Catholic College Bendigo, later for Kangaroo Flat; he also played cricket for Sandhurst. He left school and worked in IT, moving to Melbourne, where he played cricket for South Yarra. Later, he started working at Regency Media in 2004, a manufacturer of CDs and DVDs, eventually becoming CIO.

Career

Lego designing
McNaught exhibited an own build remote controlled Lego model of the Qantas Airbus A380 at the fourth Brickvention in Melbourne in 2010. The airplane was voted Best in Show by the AFOLs, and received media attention.

McNaught took the A380 to the international Brickworld event in Chicago, and was seen by a representative of the Lego company. McNaught was asked if he would be interested in becoming a Lego Certified Professional. The Lego Certified Professionals are a small number (21 as of 2021) of professional adult Lego builders whom the Lego Group consider to be trusted business partners, selected for their building proficiency and professional approach towards Lego fans and the public. After he went through the six-month qualification process he became the first and only Lego Certified Professional in the southern hemisphere. In 2013 he quit his job at Regency Media, and started his own business. Based in Melbourne Australia, McNaught is the managing director of The Brickman team. He has two full-time and two casual employees, working as Lego artists and craftspeople. In his warehouse he holds 5,126,537 Lego bricks.

With his team McNaught built Lego structures for Lego offices, produced four global touring exhibitions, models for museums, galleries and shopping centres worldwide. For the 2016 AFL Grand Final, he built a Lego MCG at Myer in Melbourne. He has also made large Lego models of the Colosseum, the Acropolis and Pompeii for the Nicholson Museum at the Sydney University. The team has won awards for their works.

Lego Masters

In 2019, McNaught was selected to be the judge in the Australian reality television Lego Master. A Lego Masters series based on the British series of the same name in which teams compete to build the best Lego project. The first season premiered on 28 April 2019 on Nine Network hosted by Hamish Blake. Season 2 started in 2020.

Personal life
McNaught is married to Tracy Britten.

References

External links
 

1973 births
Australian designers
Lego people
Living people
People from Bendigo